Tetrallantos is a genus of green algae in the Scenedesmaceae family.

References

 
 

Sphaeropleales genera
Sphaeropleales